William David Black (October 17, 1867 – October 24, 1944) was speaker of the Legislature of Ontario in 1927-1929 and served as Conservative MLA for Addington from 1911 to 1943.

He was born in Dundas County, Ontario, the son of William Black. After leaving the family farm, Black worked as a trackman for the Canadian Pacific Railway. In 1892, he married Georgia R. Griffith. Black moved to Parham in 1894, where he operated a general store and worked as a contractor. He was also involved in lumbering and contracting in the Temagami region. Black served on the municipal council for Parham and was a justice of the peace and an issuer of marriage licenses. He also served as secretary-treasurer of the Agricultural Society.

He retired from politics in 1943 due to health problems. Black died in Ottawa the following year at the age of 76.

References

External links

1867 births
1944 deaths
Speakers of the Legislative Assembly of Ontario
Progressive Conservative Party of Ontario MPPs
Canadian justices of the peace